Inge Ejderstedt (born 24 December 1946) is a former Swedish footballer who played as a midfielder.

Ejderstedt began his career in Östers IF and became Swedish champion in 1968. 1970-1974 he played for RSC Anderlecht in Belgium he won the Belgian league in 1972 and 1974. In 1974, he returned to Sweden.

As a midfielder Inge Ejderstedt was a member of the Swedish national football team 23 times. He played for Sweden in the 1970 FIFA World Cup and the 1974 FIFA World Cup.

References

External links

1946 births
Living people
Swedish footballers
Swedish expatriate footballers
Sweden international footballers
1970 FIFA World Cup players
1974 FIFA World Cup players
Östers IF players
R.S.C. Anderlecht players
Expatriate footballers in Belgium
Swedish expatriate sportspeople in Belgium
Belgian Pro League players
Association football midfielders